The Reward is a 1965 American Western film directed by Serge Bourguignon and starring Max von Sydow, Yvette Mimieux, Efrem Zimbalist Jr. and Gilbert Roland. based on a novel by Michael Barrett.

Plot
El Paso crop duster Scott Svenson accidentally flies his plane into a shallow pipe hidden just below the dirt landing area across the Mexican border. The disturbed pipe causes a water tower to collapse. By chance he spots a friend, Frank Bryant, in a car with a woman.

Svenson then notices Bryant's face on a $50,000 reward poster. Since he must pay for the damage to the tower, Svenson offers to assist a local law enforcement official, Capt. Carbajal, in tracking down and capturing Bryant, whereupon they would split the reward.

A posse is formed that includes Sgt. Lopez and two other men, Joaquin and young Luis, who dreams of becoming a bullfighter. Bryant and the woman, Sylvia, are tracked down, but Lopez—learning of the reward shortly after Bryant's apprehension—now wants a percentage of the reward for his efforts. And as soon as Joaquin makes a decision to help Bryant and the woman escape, Lopez kills both Bryant and Joaquin.

Luis tries to round up the posse's remaining horses, but dies in the attempt. Carbajal then is stricken with malaria and turns seriously ill. There is little left to do for Svenson and the woman except try to get back to town safely on foot.

Cast
 Max von Sydow as Svenson Swenson
 Yvette Mimieux as Sylvia
 Efrem Zimbalist, Jr. as Frank Bryant
 Gilbert Roland as Capt. Carbajal
 Emilio Fernández as Sgt. Lopez (as Emilio Fermandez)
 Nino Castelnuovo as Luis 
 Henry Silva as Joaquin
 Rodolfo Acosta as Patron 
 Julian Rivero as El Viejo

Production
The film was made for $2,685,000.

Reception
According to Fox records, the film needed to earn $4,400,000 in rentals to break even and only made $1,615,000.

See also
 List of American films of 1965

References

External links
 
 
 
 

1965 films
1965 Western (genre) films
1960s English-language films
20th Century Fox films
CinemaScope films
American Western (genre) films
Films directed by Serge Bourguignon
Films set in Mexico
Neo-Western films
1960s American films